Edward Strathearn Gordon, Baron Gordon of Drumearn,  (10 April 1814 – 21 August 1879) was a Scottish judge and politician.

Early life and education
Gordon was born on 10 April 1814. He was educated at Inverness Royal Academy, Royal High School, Edinburgh, the University of Glasgow and the University of Edinburgh.

Career
He was called to the Scottish bar in 1835. He was appointed Sheriff of Perth for 1858 to 1866, Solicitor General for Scotland from 1866 to 1867, and Lord Advocate from 1867 to 1868 and again from 1874 to 1876. He was Dean of the Faculty of Advocates from 1868 to 1874. He became a Queen's Counsel in 1868, and was appointed a Privy Counsellor in 1874. He was a made a Law Life Peer in 1876 as Baron Gordon of Drumearn, in the County of Stirling, and sat as a Lord of Appeal from 1876 to 1879.

He was the Conservative Member of Parliament for Thetford from 1867 to 1868 and for Glasgow and Aberdeen Universities from 1869 to 1876.

Personal life
In 1845, Gordon married Agnes MacInnes. Together they had seven children, including Frederick Gordon. Their daughter Ella married in 1871 John James Hood Gordon.

As of 1874–75, he lived at 2 Randolph Crescent on the edge of the Moray Estate in western Edinburgh.

He died in Brussels while travelling to Homburg for his health and is buried with his family against the original north boundary wall of Dean Cemetery in Edinburgh.

References

Sources
Who Was Who

External links 
 

Gordon, Edward Strathearn
Gordon, Edward Strathearn
People educated at Inverness Royal Academy
People educated at the Royal High School, Edinburgh
Alumni of the University of Glasgow
Alumni of the University of Edinburgh
Gordon, Edward Strathearn
Gordon, Edward Strathearn
Gordon, Edward Strathearn
Scottish sheriffs
Gordon of Drumearn
Gordon, Edward Strathearn
Scottish Tory MPs (pre-1912)
Gordon, Edward Strathearn
Gordon, Edward Strathearn
Gordon, Edward Strathearn
UK MPs who were granted peerages
19th-century King's Counsel
Members of the Judicial Committee of the Privy Council
Gordon, Edward Strathearn
Solicitors General for Scotland
Lord Advocates
Life peers created by Queen Victoria